Thomas Edward Jordan (born May 23, 1968) is an American former professional basketball player, whose club career spanned from 1988 to 2003.

College career
Jordan played college basketball at Oklahoma State University. He was ineligible as a freshman in 1987–88, and in his sophomore year, he averaged 13.8 points and 5.8 rebounds per game. Jordan's decision to leave college early to play professionally was due to a lack of team chemistry.

Jordan said that he never "enjoyed" basketball, he only "played it." He used the sport as a means to get a free college education, and any desires of playing professionally was not necessarily his goal. In October 1998, Jordan said, "If the air blew up the ball, I'm not going to cry. Don't get me wrong, I won't turn down a pro career if that comes, but I'm not counting on it."

Professional career
After his sophomore year of college, Jordan began a pro club career. He played professionally for 14 years, in six countries, which included time spent playing in the National Basketball Association. In April 1993, Jordan was signed as a free agent by the Philadelphia 76ers, and he played in the final four games of the 1992–93 season, averaging 11.0 points, 4.8 rebounds, and 1.3 blocks per game.

References

1968 births
Living people
AEK B.C. players
American expatriate basketball people in Argentina
American expatriate basketball people in Greece
American expatriate basketball people in Italy
American expatriate basketball people in Latvia
American expatriate basketball people in Spain
American expatriate basketball people in Turkey
American men's basketball players
Atenas basketball players
Baloncesto Superior Nacional players
Basketball players from Baltimore
Cangrejeros de Santurce basketball players
Cantabria Baloncesto players
CB Valladolid players
CB Zaragoza players
Eczacıbaşı S.K. (men's basketball) players
Gimnasia y Esgrima de La Plata basketball players
Libertad de Sunchales basketball players
Liga ACB players
Oklahoma State Cowboys basketball players
Olimpia Milano players
Pagrati B.C. players
Philadelphia 76ers players
Power forwards (basketball)
Saski Baskonia players
S.S. Felice Scandone players
Trabzonspor B.K. players
Undrafted National Basketball Association players